The Miles M.25 Martinet was a target tug aircraft of the Royal Air Force (RAF) and Fleet Air Arm (FAA) that was in service during the Second World War. It was the first British aircraft to be designed specifically for target towing.

Work on the Martinet was started in response to the RAF's shortage of obsolete frontline aircraft for target towing duties. It was intentionally designed with as much commonality as was feasible to existing production aircraft, being a derivative of Miles' prolific Master trainer. The first prototype Martinet conducted its maiden flight on 24 April 1942, with quantity production commencing immediately thereafter. A total of 1,724 Martinets were produced, of which the majority were operated either by the RAF or FAA, although a minority were also used by overseas and civilian operators.

The Martinet was also developed into a relatively secretive aircraft in response to Specification Q.10/43, which called for a radio-controlled target drone. This aircraft, designated M.50 Queen Martinet, was only produced in small numbers, and its existence was a state secret for numerous years, being only officially acknowledged during 1946. Several other derivatives of the base aircraft were also produced, including a dedicated glider tug and a trainer variant.

Development

Origins
Prior to 1941, the target tug role had been historically fulfilled by reusing former frontline aircraft that had become obsolete or been deemed to be surplus to requirements. However, while the crucial Battle of Britain was being waged and attrition rates were driven high amongst either side, the RAF found itself with a shortage of frontline aircraft. Seeking to avoid withdrawing existing combat-capable aircraft to perform as target tugs, the Air Ministry opted to procure new build aircraft specifically for this need, approaching Miles Aircraft Ltd with a request to rapidly produce a specialised target tug aircraft based upon the Miles Master trainer aircraft.

The requirements were formalised by the Ministry as Specification 12/41. Amongst the listed requirements was a stipulation that, in order simplify manufacturing as much as possible, the envisioned aircraft ought maximise the use of standardised components wherever feasible. 

On 24 April 1942, the first prototype Martinet conducted its maiden flight from Woodley Aerodrome in the hands of chief test pilot Flight Lieutenant Thomas Rose. Results were satisfactory enough that production commenced immediately thereafter, leading to the Martinet rapidly supplanting the Master II on Miles' assembly lines at Woodley. In total, 1,724 Martinets were produced; the majority of which served with either the RAF or Fleet Air Arm (FAA), although a minority of the type were adopted by overseas operators as well during the post war era.

Further development
The Martinet became the basis for further projects by the company. During 1943, it was decided to produce a derivative of the Martinet that functioned as a radio-controlled target drone to meet Specification Q.10/43. This variant, designated M.50 Queen Martinet, was quickly prototyped and a modest production contact was issued to Miles, leading to 69 examples being manufactured as a new-builds, while a further 17 aircraft were produced via the conversion of production Martinets. During its development and initial years of operation, the existence of the Queen Martinet was classified and the programme was held on the UK Government's Secrets List; it was first publicly displayed at the Farnborough Airshow in June 1946, although details about the type remained protected for a number of years thereafter.

By 1941, officials were considered a proposed improved model of the Master trainer, but such ambitions were sidelined to focus manufacturing resources on the standard Martinet model. By 1945, production pressures had alleviated to the point where serious work could commence, thus Miles set about developing a trainer model of the aircraft, designated M.37 Martinet Trainer. From the onset, this aircraft was intended to be a stopgap measure as the Air Ministry had envisioned its long term trainer to harness turboprop propulsion. The conversion involved the removal of the outboard wing fuel tanks, the installation of a revised cabin with dual controls fitted, and a reduction in overall weight. A pair of prototypes were built, the first of which made its maiden flight on 11 April 1946. However, by the time it was ready for quantity production, more advanced trainers, such as the Avro Athena and Boulton Paul Balliol, had also reached an advanced stage of development, leaving no purpose for the type and thus it received no orders.

A more numerous variant of the Martinet was the adaption of the type for operating as a tug for gliders; it shared broad similarities to the Master II tug, the rudder having its lower portion removed along with the installation of stronger towing apparatus.

Design
The Miles Martinet draws heavily upon the Miles Master II trainer aircraft. While the two aircraft shared a relatively high degree of commonality, particularly in terms of components, there were also major differences, including the strengthening of the airframe to better handle the stresses of towing a target drogue. Other differences from the Master included a longer nose, greater wingspan, and higher cockpit, while the dual flying controls of the Master were omitted as unnecessary in its new capacity. 

Both the targets and towing gear were contained in a fairing beneath the fuselage, which could be deployed and retracted by a winch; multiple implementations of this apparatus were used, including winches that were alternatively driven via electric motors or wind power. Due to the aircraft's center of gravity being altered by the design modifications, the engine was brought forwards slightly to compensate; while a more heavy-duty cooling system was also installed to aid the engine in coping with the greater power output needed to offset the elevated drag that was induced while towing.

Operational history

Numerous RAF units received Martinets during the Second World War. Specifically, the type became a staple of air gunnery schools, operational training units, anti-aircraft cooperation squadrons, and air-sea reconnaissance units.

During the late 1940s and early 1950s, the type was gradually withdrawn from service within Britain's armed forces. A total of five former RAF Martinets received civil registrations and were flown by civilians both in Britain and overseas. Efforts were made to promote surplus Martinet to fulfil additional roles, one such proposal involved the type's adoption by the Royal Hellenic Air Force to perform missions such as artillery spotting, general observation, and close air support.

Variants
M.25 Martinet Two-seat target tug aircraft.
Martinet TT.Mk IService designation for the target tug M.25.
M.50 Queen Martinet Unmanned radio-controlled target drone; 11 built and 58 converted from TT.1s.
M.37 Martinet Trainer Two-seat training aircraft; two converted from TT.1s.

Operators

 Belgian Air Force (11 operated from 1947–1953 as target tugs)

 French Air Force – 41 Martinet TT.1s were delivered between 1945 and 1948.

 Irish Air Corps – two Martinet TT.1s were delivered in 1946.

 Portuguese Navy
 Portuguese Air Force

 Svensk Flygtjänst AB (9 bought, 8 used as target tugs 1946–1951)

 Turkish Air Force
 
 Royal Air Force

 No. 5 Squadron RAF
 No. 20 Squadron RAF
 No. 34 Squadron RAF
 No. 269 Squadron RAF
 No. 285 Squadron RAF
 No. 286 Squadron RAF
 No. 287 Squadron RAF
 No. 289 Squadron RAF
 No. 290 Squadron RAF
 No. 291 Squadron RAF
 No. 520 Squadron RAF
 No. 567 Squadron RAF
 No. 577 Squadron RAF
 No. 587 Squadron RAF
 No. 595 Squadron RAF
 No. 598 Squadron RAF
 No. 631 Squadron RAF
 No. 639 Squadron RAF
 No. 650 Squadron RAF
 No. 679 Squadron RAF
 No. 691 Squadron RAF
 No. 695 Squadron RAF

 Royal Navy Fleet Air Arm
Data from:

 718 Naval Air Squadron
 722 Naval Air Squadron
 723 Naval Air Squadron
 725 Naval Air Squadron
 726 Naval Air Squadron
 728 Naval Air Squadron
 733 Naval Air Squadron
 736 Naval Air Squadron
 740 Naval Air Squadron
 766 Naval Air Squadron
 770 Naval Air Squadron
 771 Naval Air Squadron
 772 Naval Air Squadron
 773 Naval Air Squadron
 775 Naval Air Squadron
 776 Naval Air Squadron
779 Naval Air Squadron
789 Naval Air Squadron
792 Naval Air Squadron
793 Naval Air Squadron
 794 Naval Air Squadron
797 Naval Air Squadron

Specifications (M.25)

Surviving aircraft
[[File:Martinet (2541291261).jpg|thumb|The preserved MS902' at the Museum of Berkshire Aviation, June 2008]]
A single Martinet survives; it is owned by the Museum of Berkshire Aviation in the United Kingdom. The aircraft (RAF serial number MS902) was built in 1943, and spent its operational life in Iceland at RAF Reykjavik. In 1949, MS902 was sold to the Akureyri Flying Club and given the Icelandic civil registration TF-SHC. The club flew it until it crashed in 1951 near Kopasker in north-east Iceland. The wreckage remained at the crash site until 1977, when it was recovered and placed in storage by the Icelandic Aviation Historical Society.

The aircraft was returned to the United Kingdom in 1996 by the Museum of Berkshire Aviation and has since been the subject of a lengthy restoration project."Martinet Restoration News." The Museum of Berkshire Aviation. Retrieved: 13 August 2019.

See also

References
Citations

Bibliography

 
 Thetford, Owen. "Aircraft of the Royal Air Force Since 1918." Putnam, 1962.
 Towle, Philip. "Pilots and Rebels: The Use of Aircraft in Unconventional Warfare, 1918-1988." Brassey's, 1989. .

Further reading

 Amos, Peter. Miles Aircraft – The Wartime Years, 1939 to 1945''. Tonbridge, Kent, UK: Air-Britain (Historians) Ltd, 2012. .

External links

 Miles Martinet as a model via ipmsstockholm.org
 The Miles Martinet via iwm.org.uk

1940s British special-purpose aircraft
1940s British military aircraft
Martinet
Single-engined tractor aircraft
Aircraft first flown in 1942